Biscayne Southern College was located in North Carolina, United States, with its main campus in Concord.  It ceased operating in 2002. 

The college  was founded in 1948 in Concord.   In 1974, Evans Business College in Gastonia (founded in 1940) was taken over by Biscayne Southern as a branch campus.   And in 1975, North Carolina granted the college, now with three locations (Gastonia, Concord, and Charlotte), a license to have degree granting programs.  John R. Hamrick became dean of the Charlotte campus in 1973.

As of 1983, the college was operating as a liberal arts college with a total enrollment of 526, and offered four-year degrees.

References

Concord, North Carolina
Defunct private universities and colleges in North Carolina
Educational institutions disestablished in 2002
Educational institutions established in 1948
Education in Cabarrus County, North Carolina
1948 establishments in North Carolina
2002 disestablishments in North Carolina